Bhimkund (also known as Neelkund) is a natural water tank and a holy place in Madhya Pradesh, India.  It is located near Bajna village in Chhatarpur district, Madhya Pradesh. It is 77 km away from Chhatarpur by road in the Bundelkhand region.

Bhimkund is a natural water source and a holy place that dates from the era of the Mahabharata. The water of the kund (tank) is so clean and transparent that one can clearly see fish swimming in the water. The kund lies in a cave, about 3 metres from the mouth. To the left of the entrance is a small Shivalinga. The pool is a deep indigo blue which contrasts with the red stone walls.

A story from the Mahabharata links Bhimkund with the Pandavas. Weary under the scorching Surya, Draupadi fainted of thirst. Bhim, the strongest of the five brothers, hit the ground with his gada water surged out and the pool came into being.

The roof of the cave has a small opening just above the kund; this is the place Bhim is said to have hit with his gada.

Another legend has it that the Vedic sage Narada performed the Gandharva Gaanam (celestial song) in praise of Lord Vishnu. Pleased with his devotion, Vishnu emerged from the kund and the water turned blue because of Vishnu’s dark complexion.

The pool is also known as Neel Kund (blue pool) and Narada Kund'' (Njaya pool)

References

External links

Lakes of India